Luso may refer to:

 Luso (Mealhada), a civil parish in the municipality of Mealhada, Portugal
 Luis Eduardo Delgado (born 1984), Spanish footballer commonly known as Luso
 Luso Clemens, the protagonist in the video game Final Fantasy Tactics A2: Grimoire of the Rift
 A prefix meaning relating to Portugal or Portuguese (after the Roman province of Lusitania, corresponding to part of modern Portugal)

See also
 Lusus